Matthew Walton may refer to:
Matthew Walton (died 1819), U.S. representative from Kentucky
Matthew Walton (cricketer) (1837–1888), English cricketer 
Matt Walton (born 1973), American actor